Henry J. Kaiser High School is a small to medium-sized high school located at 11155 Almond Avenue in Fontana, California. Kaiser High is one of five comprehensive high schools within Fontana Unified School District. The school is named after renowned American industrialist Henry J. Kaiser, who founded the famous Kaiser Steel Mill, which helped to revolutionize the city of Fontana.
 
The school was established in 1998. As of 2021, the principal is Jose A. Espinoza.  Kaiser High School has been experimenting recently with small learning communities.

Demographics
As of 2013, the student population was 84.5% Hispanic, 5.1% White/Non-Hispanic, 6.8% of African American, 1.4% Asian, 1.1% Filipino, .3% American Indian or Alaskan Native, .3% Pacific Islander,  and .5% other or not specified ethnic backgrounds.

Athletics

Football 
Kaiser High School is known for its successful football program under coach Dick Bruich. Under his supervision, he led Kaiser Football to one state championship, two CIF championships, one CIF runner-up award, two CIF semi-final appearances, eight Sunkist League titles, and eight consecutive playoff berths, before retiring in 2009.
 
In 2006 Lonyae Miller was a standout on the football team, chosen as All-CIF Southern Section at running back and named the Sunkist League Offensive MVP. Miller later attended Fresno State and is now a professional player in the NFL.

As of 2014 the football team were back-to-back Sunkist League champions. In 2012, the Kaiser Football team made it to the SS-CIF championship, where they defeated Rancho Verde to claim the 2012 CIF Central Division Championship Title.

Student activities

Catamount Pride Marching Band & Color Guard 
Kaiser High School is home to the Catamount Pride Marching Band and Color Guard. In 2008, and most recently 2014, the band won the sweepstakes at the Azusa Golden Days Parade. They've also won sweepstakes in the Riverside King Band Review, 2nd place in the Chino Band Review, 10,000 dollars at the LA County Fair, sweepstakes and music award in the Ganesha Band Review, and 1st place in the Arcadia Band Review.

The Kaiser Catamount Pride Marching Band hosted the first annual Kaiser Band Review September 26, 2009.

In 2019, the band participated in the 2019 Rose Parade with Grand Marshal Chaka Khan in the opening show.

Kaiser Artistic and Theatrical Society 
Kaiser Artistic and Theatrical Society, known as "K.A.T.S. Productions", is the name of the drama club at Henry J. Kaiser High. The club is responsible for producing the school theatrical productions each year. In addition, the club engages in other theatrical activities, like improvisational workshops and field trips to see professional productions. The club includes an active troupe of the International Thespian Society, number 6721.

Shows performed at Kaiser High School include:
Rodgers and Hammerstein's Cinderella, The Devil and Daniel Webster, How to Succeed in Business Without Really Trying, Harvey, Annie Get Your Gun, Picnic, Little Shop of Horrors, Arsenic and Old Lace, Into the Woods, Little Women, Once Upon A Mattress, The Mousetrap, A Christmas Story, Once On This Island, Fools, A Christmas Carol, Seussical the Musical, Twelve Angry Men, Taming of the Shrew, West Side Story, The Diviners, Hamlet,  Midsummer/Jersey, Spoon River Anthology, Romeo and Juliet, Fame, Alice, Rent, Julius Caesar, Les Misérables, The Winter's Tale, Legally Blonde, Peter and the Starcatcher, Lazarus Rising, 1984, Alice in Wonderland, The Laramie Project, The Addams Family, Titus Andronicus,  Twelfth Night,  Little Women,  Bridge to Terabithia, The Wizard of Oz, A Piece of My Heart, and The Crucible.

Awards

4 CIF Football Championship(2003,2004,2012, and 2018)
1 CIF Softball Championship(2012)
Inland Empire Team of the Decade for football(Sunkist league champions 2001–2011) 
2nd Place at SCSBOA 35th Annual Chino Invitational Band Review
1st Place at SCSBOA 2005 La Palma Days Band Review
5th Place at SCSBOA Arcadia Festival Of Bands (2005, 2006)
Sweepstakes at SCSBOA Riverside King Invitational Band Review (2006, 2008, 2013, 2014)
4th Place at SCSBOA Annual Chino Invitational Band Review (2006, 2007)
Sweepstakes at SCSBOA Azusa Golden Days Parade (2007, 2008, 2011, 2014)
3rd Place at SCSBOA Riverside King Band Review (2007, 2009)
2nd Place at SCSBOA 2007 La Palma Days Band Review
3rd Place at SCSBOA 2007 Arcadia Festival Of Bands
3rd Place at SCSBOA 38th Annual Chino Invitational Band Review
Sweepstakes at SCSBOA 2008 Ganesha Band Review
1st Place at SCSBOA Arcadia Festival Of Bands (2008, 2009)
3rd Place at SCSBOA 2009 San Dimas Western Days Parade
1st Place at SCSBOA 2009 Ganesha Band Review
1st Place at SCSBOA Azusa Golden Days (2010, 2012, 2013) & Riverside King Band Review (2010 & 2012)
1st Place at SCSBOA 41st Annual Chino Invitational Band Review
2nd Place at SCJA Eisenhower & Patriot Field Shows 2012
2nd & 3rd Place at the Los Angeles County Fair Marching Band Competitions (2006-2011, 2013)
Sweepstakes at the Los Angeles County Fair Marching Band Competition (2014)
3rd Place at the MBOS Vista Murrieta Field Tournament 2013
5th Place at the SCSBOA 43rd Annual Chino Invitational Band Review
4th Place at the SCSBOA 44th Annual Chino Invitational Band Review
Overall Winners of the SCJA Eisenhower & San Gorgonio Field Shows 2014

Notable alumni
 Tyler Allgeier (Class of 2017) Professional Football Player NFL, Atlanta Falcons
 Chris Carter (Class of 2005) former Professional Football Player NFL, Pittsburgh Steelers
 David Carter (Class of 2006) former Professional Football Player NFL, Arizona Cardinals
 Lonyae Miller (Class of 2006) former Professional Football Player NFL, Dallas Cowboys
 Jason Shirley (Class of 2003) former Professional Football Player NFL, Cincinnati Bengals
 Josh Shirley (Class of 2010) former Professional Football Player NFL, Tampa Bay Buccaneers

References

External links
 Official website

Education in Fontana, California
High schools in San Bernardino County, California
Public high schools in California
1998 establishments in California
Educational institutions established in 1998